Lecontia is a genus of conifer bark beetles in the family Boridae, containing the single species, Lecontia discicollis (LeConte, 1850). It is found in Central America and North America.

References

Tenebrionoidea
Monotypic Cucujiformia genera
Articles created by Qbugbot